Sholakuri Union is a union of Madhupur Upazila, Tangail District, Bangladesh. It is situated  25 km north of Madhupur and 64 km northeast of Tangail deep in the Madhupur tract.

Demographics

According to Population Census 2011 performed by Bangladesh Bureau of Statistics, The total population of Sholakuri union is 31471. There are  7984 households in total.

Education

The literacy rate of Sholakuri Union is 33.9% (Male-34.3%, Female-33.6%).

See also
 Union Councils of Tangail District

References

Populated places in Dhaka Division
Populated places in Tangail District
Unions of Madhupur Upazila